Beta Camelopardalis, Latinised from β Camelopardalis, is the brightest star in the northern constellation of Camelopardalis. It is bright enough to be faintly visible to the naked eye, having an apparent visual magnitude of 4.02. Based upon an annual parallax shift of 3.74 mas as seen from Earth, it is located roughly 870 light-years from the Sun. It is moving closer with a radial velocity of −1.90 km/s and is most likely a single star.

This is a yellow-hued G-type supergiant/bright giant with a stellar classification of G1 Ib–IIa. It is an estimated 60 million years old and is spinning with a projected rotational velocity of 11.7 km/s. This is an unusually high rate of rotation for an evolved star of this type. One possible explanation is that it may have engulfed a nearby giant planet, such as a hot Jupiter.

Beta Camelopardalis has 6.5 times the mass of the Sun and has expanded to around 58 the Sun's radius. It is a source of X-ray emission.

β Cam has two visual companions: a 7th-magnitude A5-class star at an angular separation of 84 arcseconds; and a 12th-magnitude star at 15 arcseconds.

References

External links
 HR 1603
 CCDM J05034+6026
 Image Beta Camelopardalis

G-type supergiants
G-type bright giants
Double stars
Camelopardalis (constellation)
Camelopardalis, Beta
BD+60 0856
Camelopardalis, 10
031910
023522
1603